The Westfield San Francisco Centre is an upscale shopping mall located in San Francisco, California, managed by the Westfield Group and co-owned by Westfield and Brookfield Asset Management. It is anchored  by Nordstrom and Bloomingdale's, and includes a Century Theatres multiplex and the Downtown Campus of San Francisco State University. It connects directly to the Powell Street station via an underground entrance on the concourse floor.

History

After a slow start, it soon became one of the top performing shopping centers in the country. In 1996, the adjoining Emporium (it had dropped the Capwell name by then) was shuttered in the wake of Federated Department Stores' buyout of its parent, Broadway Stores.  The vacated store was temporarily used as a Macy's furniture store while it renovated its Union Square flagship in 1997.

In May 1997, Urban Shopping Centers, Inc., a Real Estate Investment Trust acquired a half-interest and management of the center.  This was followed by Urban's own buyout by Rodamco North America N.V. (a European property firm primarily invested in the United States) in October 2000 and Rodamco's subsequent sale to a consortium including The Westfield Group in January 2002. Westfield acquired its initial 50% stake in the center at this time and soon bought the rest.

In 2003, Forest City, which had acquired redevelopment rights to the long-vacant Emporium store from Federated, reached an agreement with Westfield to jointly redevelop the two properties. Unveiled on September 28, 2006, the newly expanded mixed-use Westfield San Francisco Centre (designed by the Kohn Pedersen Fox architectural firm, with Kevin Kennon as the Design Principal) includes Bloomingdale's West Coast flagship store, a nine-screen Century Theatres multiplex theater featuring 2 XD screens, a 30,000 square feet Bristol Farms gourmet supermarket (closed January 2017), and the Downtown Campus for San Francisco State University in its 1.5 million+ ft² of space.

The redevelopment cost $440 million. Only the front facade and landmark dome of the original structure were preserved; the rest of the structure was completely gutted and replaced. Upon completion of the project, Forest City became an equity partner and along with Westfield assumed responsibility for day-to-day management. In March 2009, it was announced that Westfield San Francisco Centre shopping center was named as one of nine finalists vying for the title of “World’s Best Shopping Center” as part of the International Council of Shopping Centers Inc.’s inaugural “Best-of-the-Best” awards. Westfield San Francisco Centre ended up winning the "Best-of-the-Best" award for design and development; it was one of only four shopping centers in the world to win.

In 2011, the San Francisco Police Department considered putting a substation in the mall to prevent rampant shoplifting.

In the summer of 2021, a Shake Shack opened in the former Bristol Farms space.

Gallery

Anchors and major tenants
 Bloomingdale's (338,000 ft²; opened 2006)
 Nordstrom (350,000 ft²; opened 1988)
 Century Theatres & XD 9-screen multiplex (53,000 ft²)
 San Francisco State University Downtown Campus (107,000 ft²; opened 2006)

See also

References
Notes

Sources
 Westfield San Francisco Centre Opening Fact Sheet
 Westfield San Francisco Centre Press Release
 International Council of Shopping Centers

External links

 

Shopping malls in San Francisco
Market Street (San Francisco)
Union Square, San Francisco
San Francisco Centre
Brookfield Asset Management
Shopping malls established in 1988